Lal Masjid or Red Mosque may refer to:

Jami Ul-Alfar Mosque, Pettah, Sri Lanka
Lal Masjid, Islamabad, Pakistan
Siege of Lal Masjid, 2007
2008 Lal Masjid bombing
Lal Masjid, Delhi, India
Red Mosque, Berat, Albania